DIA or Dia may refer to:

Government establishments 
 Defense Intelligence Agency, United States foreign military intelligence agency
 Defence Intelligence Agency (India) Indian foreign military intelligence agency
 Department of Internal Affairs, New Zealand public service department 
 Department of Indian Affairs, Canadian federal department
 Defence Intelligence Agency (Nigeria)
 Defense Intelligence Agency (South Korea)
 Direzione Investigativa Antimafia, an Italian law-enforcement agency

Organizations and businesses

Airports 
 Davao International Airport (DVO) 
 Denver International Airport (DEN)
 Dubai International Airport (DXB)
 Doha International Airport (DIA)
 Durban International Airport (DUR)
 Washington Dulles International Airport (IAD)

Arts 
 Design Institute of Australia, Australian design organisation
 Detroit Institute of Arts, American art museum
 Dia Art Foundation, non-profit arts organization

Charity 
 Design and Industries Association, British charity

Entertainment 
 Dia (film), a 2020 Indian Kannada language film
 DIA (group), a South Korean girl group
 Dia (singer), stage name for Kim Ji-Eun, a South Korean female singer

Trade 
 Dia (supermarket chain), Spanish multinational supermarket chain

Youth 
 Detroit International Academy for Young Women
 Development in Action (DiA), a youth-led UK NGO focusing on international development and global citizenship amongst young people
 Sakartvelos Gogona Skautebis Asociacia 'Dia', the Georgian Girl Scout Association

Places 
 Diá, Drôme, France
 Dia (Bithynia), an ancient town of Bithynia
 Dia (Coele-Syria), an ancient city of Coele-Syria
 Dia (island), Greek island off the coast of Crete
 Dia, Mali
 Dia (moon), a moon of Jupiter
 Naxos (island), Greek island in the Aegean, named Dia by the ancient Greeks

Publications 
 Al Día (disambiguation), various newspapers
 El Día (disambiguation), various newspapers
 O Dia, Brazilian newspaper
 Türkiye Diyanet Vakfı İslâm Ansiklopedisi (DİA) or İslâm Ansiklopedisi,  Turkish encyclopedia for Islamic studies
 El Nuevo Dia Puerto Rican newspaper, commonly referred to as "El Dia"

Other uses
 Dea Dia, lit. 'goddess Dia', a Roman goddess
 Dia (mythology), name of multiple figures in Greek mythology
 Dia (name), and persons with the name
 Dia language, a Torricelli language of Papua New Guinea
 Dia (software), a software program for diagram creation
 Diameter, the width of a circle, often abbreviated to "dia."
 Diamond (Shugo Chara!), also known as Dia, a character from the manga series Shugo Chara! 
 , British cargo ship that sank in the Mediterranean in 1964
 Dow Diamonds (NYSE: DIA), an exchange-traded fund tracking the Dow Jones Industrial Average
 Document Interchange Architecture, an IBM standard for electronic mail, part of IBM  Systems Application Architecture
 Data-independent acquisition, an acquisition type in mass spectrometry
 Diisopropylamine, a common organic base and precursor to Lithium Diisopropylamide

See also
Diaa, a given name
Diya (disambiguation)